Dashzevgiin Ariunaa (born 17 October 1965) is a Mongolian gymnast. She competed in five events at the 1980 Summer Olympics.

References

External links
 

1965 births
Living people
Mongolian female artistic gymnasts
Olympic gymnasts of Mongolia
Gymnasts at the 1980 Summer Olympics
Place of birth missing (living people)